Matzoff is a river of Hesse, Germany. It flows into the Ems in Niedenstein-Kirchberg.

See also
List of rivers of Hesse

Rivers of Hesse
Rivers of Germany